The Orakzai dynasty is a South Asian dynasty, directly descended from the Orakzai tribe. Various branches ruled the princely states of Bhopal, Kurwai, Muhammadgarh and Basoda.

History 
The Orakzai dynasty is divided into two branches: the Mirazi Khel, founded by Dost Mohammad Khan, and the Firuz Khel, founded by Diler Khan.

References 

Dynasties of India